Bubble gum or bubblegum is a type of chewing gum, designed to be inflated out of the mouth as a bubble.

Bubble gum flavor
While there is a bubble gum "flavor" – which various artificial flavorings including esters are mixed to obtain – it varies from one company to another. Esters used in synthetic bubblegum flavoring may include methyl salicylate, ethyl butyrate, benzyl acetate, amyl acetate or cinnamic aldehyde.
A natural bubble gum flavoring can be produced by combining banana, pineapple, cinnamon, cloves, and wintergreen. Vanilla, cherry, lemon, and orange oil have also been suggested as ingredients.

Composition
In modern chewing gum, if natural rubber such as chicle is used, it must pass several purity and cleanliness tests. However, most modern types of chewing gum use synthetic gum-based materials. These materials allow for longer lasting flavor, a better texture, and a reduction in tackiness.

History
In 1928, Walter Diemer, an accountant for the Fleer Chewing Gum Company in Philadelphia, was experimenting with new gum recipes. One recipe, based on a formula for a chewing gum called "Blibber Blubber", was found to be less sticky than regular chewing gum and stretched more easily. This gum became highly successful and was eventually named by the president of Fleer as Dubble Bubble because of its stretchy texture.

This remained the dominant brand of bubble gum until after WWII, when Bazooka bubble gum entered the market.

Until the 1970s, bubble gum still tended to stick to one's face. At that time, synthetic bubble gum was introduced, which would almost never stick as a bubble popped. The first brands in the US to use these new synthetic gum bases were Hubba Bubba and Bubble Yum.

Bubble gum got its distinctive pink color because the original recipe Diemer worked on produced a dingy gray colored gum, so he added red dye (diluted to pink), as that was the only dye he had on hand at the time.

Flavors
In taste tests, children tend to prefer strawberry and blue raspberry flavors, rejecting more complex flavors, as they say these make them want to swallow the gum rather than continue chewing.

Records

Tourism
Bubblegum Alley is a tourist attraction in downtown San Luis Obispo, California, known for its accumulation of used bubble gum on the walls of an alley.

The Market Theater Gum Wall is a brick wall covered in used chewing gum, located in an alleyway in Post Alley under Pike Place Market in Downtown Seattle.

See also

 Blibber-Blubber
 Functional gum
 Gumball machine
 Gum base
 Gum industry
 Inca Kola
 List of chewing gum brands

References

Chewing gum
Bubbles (physics)
Products introduced in 1928
American inventions